Wycliffe Ambetsa Oparanya (born 25 March 1956) is a Kenyan politician who served as the governor of Kakamega County from 2013 to 2022. He was elected on 4 March 2013 and became the first governor of Kakamega County following promulgation of the Constitution of Kenya in 2010 and subsequently in August 2017, for his second term as the governor. He is, therefore, the pioneer Governor of Kakamega County under the devolved system of governance in Kenya that established 47 counties. He was previously Minister of State for Planning, National Development and Vision 2030 in the government of the late President Mwai Kibaki. He was appointed on 14 January 2019 as the Council of Governors of Kenya chairperson. Wycliffe Oparanya is also the current Ford Kenya Party deputy party leader.

Professional/political career
Oparanya has 23 years experience in local and international Finance Management, Audit and Business Consultancy. He belongs to the Orange Democratic Movement and represented Butere Constituency in the National Assembly of Kenya since the 2007 Kenyan parliamentary election. 
Oparanya was among ministers appointed by secondment of Prime Minister Raila Odinga from The Orange Democratic Movement party after the prime minister signed the National Accord Act to form a coalition government with the late President Kibaki after the disputed 2007 elections.

External links

References

Living people
County Governors of Kenya
Orange Democratic Movement politicians
University of Nairobi alumni
Alumni of Kisii School
People from Butere
1956 births